Jay Levin is an American journalist who was founder, editor and CEO of the LA Weekly, one of the seminal newspapers of the weekly alternative press in the United States, until 1992.

Currently he is founding President of The Big EQ Campaign, a non-profit organization that has undertaken a mass marketing campaign called EQuip Our Kids! to mobilize the public to mandate that social and emotional learning (SEL) skills be included in every schools curriculum. He is also chair of the California Social-Emotional Learning Alliance, an assemblage of educators and education and grassroots organizations that advocates for universal statewide SEL from pre-school through high school.

Biography

Early life
Levin was born in New York, the son of a tool and die maker.

LA Weekly
Jay Levin is best known as the founder of the LA Weekly, of which he was editor-in-chief and president for many years before selling what he had grown to be the largest and most successful city weekly in the country. Levin put together an investment group that included actor Michael Douglas, Burt Kleiner, Joe Benadon and Pete Kameron. Levin retained many of the writers he had earlier brought to the Los Angeles Free Press and hired Joie Davidow to edit the arts and entertainment section. The publication's first issue featured a group of female comedians, including the then-little known Sandra Bernhard, on its cover. Subsequent issues featured exposés on the Los Angeles basin's air quality and U.S. interventionism in Central America. The LA Weekly was also notable for its coverage of independent cinema and the Los Angeles music scene. Davidow produced a comprehensive calendar section and explored undiscovered fashion districts, discovering new designers.
		
In 1985, the LA Weekly launched a glossy magazine, L.A. Style, which Davidow edited. L.A. Style was sold to American Express Publishing in 1988 and merged with BUZZ magazine in 1993.
	
By 1990, the LA Weekly achieved a circulation of 165,000, making it the largest urban weekly in the U.S.

Post-LA Weekly
Levin stepped down as president of the LA Weekly in 1992 in order to found a progressive cable TV network and was succeeded by Michael Sigman as publisher and Kit Rachlis as editor. The newspaper was sold to Stern Publishing, owner of the Village Voice, in 1994; in October 2005, it was sold to the Phoenix, Arizona-based Village Voice Media. In September 2012, it was transferred to the Denver-based Voice Media Group in a management buyout.

Levin founded the start-up progressive channel, Planet Central TV, and later a website and magazine called Real Talk L.A.

Recent career
For the last 20 years Levin has split his time between starting, growing or turning around media properties such as TheFix.com; and on life coaching focused on teaching life mastery and helping people reorient their lives, careers and relationships without spending years in therapy. Most recently he has been working with 15 to 20 CEOs on becoming socially conscious and effective managers while helping them elevate the bottom-line performance of their businesses and grow their companies.

Based on his knowledge of the positive effects of Life skills training, Levin early in 2016 launched The Big EQ Campaign to galvanize the public around schools including daily curriculum education for students and staff in emotional management and in relationship and co-creativity social skills – to the profound benefit of children, teens, adults, the schools themselves, and society and business (the economy) as a whole. When training in EQ development is combined with training in the skills to relate empathically to and communicate well with others, and to make cogent decisions, the familiar term used in academic circles for such overall life skills training is “Social and Emotional Learning,” known as SEL.

The Campaign argues that evidence shows that SEL skills and capacities can have a remarkable positive effect on a person's life, ability to learn, and long-term success. So much so that SEL (which includes EQ development) has the potential to elevate society as a whole - in the form of better relationships all around, less conflict, and more productive and healthier individuals, workplaces, institutions and communities. SEL training tends to dissipate violence, racism, hard drug usage and other forms of anti-social mindsets and behaviors while improving academic and life-long success and lowering criminal justice, mental and physical health and other social costs.

Over the years Levin has worked with hundreds of individuals one-on-one. Encouraged by clients, he also began offering courses to hundreds of people in Life Elevation, relationships and leadership. Highly successful in terms of reorienting people's lives, careers and inner and outer relations for the better, the courses (like his personal coaching) allow individuals to learn systems they can use to benefit themselves - in effect, participants, including CEOS, learn to become their own coaches. Along with gaining mastery of inner emotional and mental demons, participants gain a sophisticated and necessary education in the realities of human inter-reaction and selfhood that the culture fails to provide en masse. Participants report learning tools that give them more confidence in nearly every situation and which make them better able to cope when challenged.

References

External links
 

1943 births
21st-century American Jews
American chief executives in the media industry
American male journalists
Jewish American journalists
Living people